Nadejda Ostrovskaya (born 29 October 1980) is a Belarusian former tennis player.

She won ten singles and 19 doubles titles on the ITF Women's Circuit. On 15 January 2001, she reached her best singles ranking of world No. 96. On 15 April 2002, she peaked at No. 78 in the doubles rankings.

Playing for Belarus Fed Cup team, Ostrovskaya has a win–loss record of 13–9.

ITF Circuit finals

Singles: 17 (10–7)

Doubles: 37 (19–18)

References

External links
 
 
 

1980 births
Living people
Tennis players from Minsk
Belarusian female tennis players